Paul Decoutere known under the name Paul Couter (7 February 1949 – 27 April 2021) was a Belgian guitarist. He played in Freckleface,  and TC Matic.

Couter was diagnosed with cancer, and he died in Ghent on 27 April 2021, aged 72.

References

20th-century Belgian musicians
Belgian guitarists
1949 births
2021 deaths
Musicians from Bruges
Zeebrugge
Place of death missing